Mitra Phukan (Assamese: মিত্ৰা ফুকন) is an Indian author who writes in English. She is also a translator and columnist.

Biography
Her published literary works include four children's books, a biography, two novels, "The Collector's Wife" and "A Monsoon of Music" (Penguin-Zubaan) several volumes of translations of other novels and a collection of fifty of her columns, "Guwahati Gaze". Her most recent works are a collection of her own short stories "A Full Night's Thievery" (Speaking Tiger 2016) and a collection of short stories in translation, "Aghoni Bai and Other Stories" (2019).

She writes extensively on Indian music as a reviewer and essayist. Her works have been translated into many languages, and several of them are taught in colleges and Universities. As a translator herself, she has translated into English the works of some of the best known Assamese writers of fiction, including "Blossoms in the Graveyard", a translation of Jyanpeeth Awardee Birendra Kumar Bhattacharjee's "Kobor Aru Phool" and "Guilt and Other Stories" a translation of Sahitya Akademi awardee Harekrishna Deka's stories.

Her latest work is the volume "The Greatest Assamese Stories Ever Told", twenty five stories in translation selected and edited by her. She writes a column "All Things Considered" in the Assam Tribune.

She is the author of The Collector's Wife (2005), a novel set against the Assam Agitation of the 1970s and 80s. The Collector's Wife was the one of the first generation novels in English written by an Assamese writer to be published by an international house.

Phukan is also a trained classical vocalist and writes regularly on music.

Works

 Mamoni's Adventures (1986, Children's Book Trust)
 Chumki Posts a Letter (1989, Children's Book Trust)
 The Biratpur Adventure (1994, Children's Book Trust)
  R G Baruah The Architect of Modern Assam (2004, Sahitya Prakash) 
 The Collector's Wife (2005, Zubaan/Penguin)
 Terrorist Camp Adventure (2003, Scholastic)
 A Monsoon of Music (2011, Zubaan/Penguin)
 Guwahati Gaze (2013, Bhabani Publishers) 
 Blossoms in the Graveyard (2016, Niyogi Publishers)
 A Full Night's Thievery (2016, Speaking Tiger)
 Aghoni Bai And Other Stories (2019, EBH Publishers)
 Patmugi and Other Stories (2021, Assam Sahitya Sabha, with Gayatri Bhattacharjee)
 Guilt and Other Stories (2021, Speaking Tiger)
 The Greatest Assamese Stories Ever Told (2021, Aleph. Selected and Edited by Mitra Phukan)

See also

Literature from North East India
Indian English Literature

References

External links
http://www.thehindu.com/todays-paper/tp-features/tp-fridayreview/article2397962.ece?css=print
Fiction : "The Reckoning"
Fiction : "The Homecoming"
Fiction : "Spring song"
Italian translation of Mitra Phukan's Short Story "Spring Song"
https://literaryjournal.in/index.php/clri/article/view/57/77
https://www.audible.in/pd/A-Monsoon-of-Music-Audiobook/B07J5BPWFD
https://literaryjournal.in/index.php/clri/article/view/57/77
http://www.jellonline.com/index.php/jell/article/view/N9V2.309

Living people
Women writers from Assam
 
Writers from Guwahati
Indian women novelists
Year of birth missing (living people)
Indian women children's writers
Indian children's writers
Novelists from Assam
20th-century Indian translators
21st-century Indian novelists
20th-century Indian women writers
21st-century Indian women writers